This list of Russian astronomers and astrophysicists includes the famous astronomers, astrophysicists and cosmologists from the Russian Empire, the Soviet Union and the Russian Federation.

Alphabetical list


A
Tateos Agekian, one of the pioneers of Russian and world Stellar dynamics, discoverer of two evolutionary sequences of stellar systems: nearly spherical and strongly flattened
Vladimir Albitsky, discovered a significant number of asteroids
Viktor Ambartsumian, one of the founders of theoretical astrophysics, discoverer of stellar associations, founder of Byurakan Observatory in Armenia
Andrejs Auzāns, director of the Tashkent observatory, 1911-1916

B
Nikolai P. Barabashov, co-author of the ground breaking publication of the first pictures of the far side of the Moon in 1961, called Atlas of the Other Side of the Moon; a crater and a planet were named after him
Vladimir Belinski, an author of the BKL singularity model of the Universe evolution
Igor Belkovich, made contributions to astronomy; the crater Bel'kovich on the Moon is named after him
Aristarkh Belopolsky, invented a spectrograph based on the Doppler effect, among the first photographers of stellar spectra
Sergey Belyavsky, discovered the bright naked-eye comet C/1911 S3 (Beljawsky); discovered and co-discovered a number of asteroids
Gennady S. Bisnovatyi-Kogan, first determined the maximum mass of a hot neutron star
Sergey Blazhko, discovered a secondary variation of the amplitude and period of some RR Lyrae stars and related pulsating variables, now known as the Blazhko effect
Semion Braude, co-developed large-scale radio interferometers for precise examination of extraterrestrial radio sources
Fyodor Bredikhin, developed the theory of comet tails, meteors and meteor showers, a director of the Pulkovo Observatory
Matvei Petrovich Bronstein, theoretical physicist; pioneer of quantum gravity; author of works in astrophysics, semiconductors, quantum electrodynamics and cosmology
Jacob Bruce, statesman, naturalist and astronomer, founder of the first observatory in Russia (in the Sukharev Tower)

C
Lyudmila Chernykh, astronomer, discovered 268 asteroids
Nikolai Chernykh, astronomer, discovered 537 asteroids and two comets
Aleksandr Chudakov, co-discoverer of the Earth's radiation belt

D
Denis Denisenko, astronomer, author of more than 25 scientific articles and a presenter at five international conferences
A. G. Doroshkevich, along with Igor Novikov, discovered cosmic microwave background radiation as a detectable phenomenon
Alexander Dubyago, expert in theoretical astrophysics; the lunar crater Dubyago is named after him and his father, Dmitry Ivanovich Dubyago
Dmitry Dubyago, expert in theoretical astrophysics, astrometry, and gravimetry; a crater on the Moon is named after him and his son

E
Vasily Engelhardt, researched comets, asteroids, nebulae, and star clusters, in an observatory he built himself

F
Vasily Fesenkov, founded the Alma-Ata (now Tien Shan) astrophysical observatory, and was the first to make a study of Zodiacal light using photometry, and suggested a theory of its dynamics
Kirill Florensky, head of Comparative Planetology at the Vernadsky Institute of the U.S.S.R. Academy of Sciences; the crater Florensky on the Moon is named after him
Alexander Friedmann, mathematician and cosmologist, discovered the expanding-universe solution to the general relativity field equations.; authored the FLRW metric of Universe
Alexei Fridman, predicted existence of smaller satellites around Uranus

G
George Gamow, theoretical physicist and cosmologist, discovered alpha decay via quantum tunneling and Gamow factor in stellar nucleosynthesis, introduced the Big Bang nucleosynthesis theory, predicted cosmic microwave background
Vitaly Ginzburg, co-developed the theory of superconductivity, the theory of electromagnetic wave propagation in plasmas, and a theory of the origin of cosmic radiation
Sergey Glazenap, astronomer; a crater on the Moon and the minor planet 857 Glasenappia are named after him
Alexander A. Gurshtein, developed a concept of history of constellations and the zodiac
Matvey Gusev, the first to prove the non-sphericity of the Moon, pioneer of photography in astronomy

I
Naum Idelson, astronomer

J
Benjamin Jekhowsky, discovered a number of asteroids; made more than 190 scientific publications; the asteroid 1606 Jekhovsky is named after him

K
Lyudmila Karachkina, discovered a number of asteroids, including the Amor asteroid 5324 Lyapunov, 10031 Vladarnolda and the Trojan asteroid 3063 Makhaon
Nikolai Kardashev, astrophysicist, inventor of Kardashev scale for ranking the space civilizations
Isaak Khalatnikov, an author of the BKL singularity model of the Universe evolution
Viktor Knorre, astronomer, discovered four asteroids
Marian Kowalski, first to measure the rotation of the Milky Way
Nikolai Aleksandrovich Kozyrev, astronomer, observed the transient lunar phenomenon
Georgij A. Krasinsky, astronomer, researched planetary motions and ephemeris
Feodosy Krasovsky, astronomer and geodesist; measured the Krasovsky ellipsoid, a coordinate system used in the USSR and the post-Soviet states
Yevgeny Krinov, astronomer, renowned meteorite researcher; the mineral Krinovite, discovered in 1966, was named after him

L
Anders Johan Lexell, astronomer and mathematician; researcher of celestial mechanics and comet astronomy; proved that Uranus is a planet rather than a comet
Andrei Linde, created the Universe chaotic inflation theory
Evgeny Lifshitz, an author of the BKL singularity model of the Universe evolution
Mikhail Lomonosov polymath, inventor of the off-axis reflecting telescope, discoverer of the atmosphere of Venus
Mikhail Lyapunov, astronomer
Kronid Lyubarsky, worked on the Soviet program of interplanetary exploration of Mars

M
Benjamin Markarian, discovered Markarian's Chain 
Dmitri Dmitrievich Maksutov, inventor of the Maksutov telescope
Aleksandr Aleksandrovich Mikhailov, credited with leading the post-war revival of the Pulkovo Observatory
Nikolay Moiseyev, expert in celestial mechanics, worked on mathematical methods of celestial calculations and theory of comet formation

N
Grigory Neujmin, discovered 74 asteroids, and most notably 951 Gaspra and 762 Pulcova
Igor Dmitriyevich Novikov, formulated the Novikov self-consistency principle, an important contribution to the theory of time travel
Boris Numerov, created various astronomic and mineralogical instruments, as well as various algorithms and methods that bear his name

P
Pavel Petrovich Parenago, known for contributions to the field of galactic astronomy
Yevgeny Perepyolkin, observed the proper motion of stars with respect to extragalactic nebula
Solomon Pikelner, made a significant contribution to the theory of the interstellar medium, solar plasma physics, stellar atmospheres, and magnetohydrodynamics
Elena V. Pitjeva, expert in the field of Solar System dynamics and celestial mechanics

S
Viktor Safronov, astronomer and cosmologist, author of the planetesimal hypothesis of planet formation
Kaspar Gottfried Schweizer, discovered five comets, and found one NGC object
Andrei Severny, known for his work on solar flares and astronomical observations from artificial satellites
Nikolai Shakura, developed theory of accretion and astrophysics of x-ray binaries, co-developed the standard theory of disk accretion
Grigory Shayn, astronomer and astrophysicist, the first director of the Crimean Astrophysical Observatory, co-developed a method for measurement of stellar rotation
Vladislav Shevchenko, astronomer, specialized in lunar exploration
Iosif Shklovsky, astronomer and astrophysicist, author of several discoveries in the fields of radio astronomy and cosmic rays, extraterrestrial life researcher
Tamara Mikhaylovna Smirnova, co-discovered the periodic comet 74P/Smirnova-Chernykh, along with Nikolai Stepanovich Chernykh; discovered various asteroids; the asteroid 5540 Smirnova was named in her honor
Friedrich Wilhelm Struve, astronomer and geodesist, founder and the first director of the Pulkovo Observatory, prominent researcher and discoverer of new double stars, initiated the construction of 2,820 km long Struve Geodetic Arc, progenitor of the Struve family of astronomers
Otto Lyudvigovich Struve, astronomer and astrophysicist, co-developed a method for measurement of stellar rotation, directed several observatories in the U.S.
Otto Wilhelm von Struve, astronomer, director of the Pulkovo Observatory, discovered over 500 double stars
Rashid Sunyaev, astrophysicist, co-predicted the Sunyaev–Zel'dovich effect of CMB distortion

T
Gavriil Tikhov, invented the feathering spectrograph; one of the first to use color filters to increase the contrast of surface details on planets

V
George Volkoff, predicted the existence of neutron stars
Boris Vorontsov-Velyaminov, discovered the absorption of light by interstellar dust, author of the Morphological Catalogue of Galaxies
Alexander Vyssotsky, created first list of nearby stars identified not by their motions in the sky, but by their intrinsic, spectroscopic, characteristics

Y
Avenir Aleksandrovich Yakovkin, astronomer
Ivan Yarkovsky, discovered the YORP and Yarkovsky effects of meteoroids or asteroids

Z
Aleksandr Zaitsev, coined the term Messaging to Extra-Terrestrial Intelligence, conducted the first intercontinental radar astronomy experiment, transmitted the Cosmic Calls and Teen Age Message
Yakov Zel'dovich, physicist, astrophysicist and cosmologist, the first to suggest that accretion discs around massive black holes are responsible for the quasar radiation, co-predicted the Sunyaev–Zel'dovich effect of CMB distortion
Abram Leonidovich Zelmanov, astronomer
Sergei Alexandrovich Zhevakin, identified ionized helium as the valve for the heat engine that drives the pulsation of Cepheid variable stars
Lyudmila Zhuravlyova, discovered a number of asteroids; ranked 43rd by Harvard University's list of those who discovered minor planets; credited with having discovered 200 such bodies
Felix Ziegel, author of more than 40 popular books on astronomy and space exploration, generally regarded as a founder of Russian ufology

See also
List of astronomers
List of astrophysicists
List of Russian scientists
List of Russian inventors
Science and technology in Russia
Pulkovo Observatory

Astrophysicists
 
 
Astronomers
Russian
Astrophysics
Russian astronomers